The Ploučnice is a river in the Czech Republic. It is a tributary of the Elbe, which it flows into in Děčín.

References

External links
 Horáčková J. & Juřičková L. (2013). "Nivní malakofauna Ploučnice (Severní Čechy). The floodplain mollusc fauna of the Ploučnice River (North Bohemia)". Malacologica Bohemoslovaca 12: 40–47.
 Beran L. (1998). "Vodní měkkýši Ploučnice". Bezděz, vlastivědný sborník Českolipska, Česká Lípa 7: 173–180.

Rivers of the Liberec Region
Rivers of the Ústí nad Labem Region
Populated places in Děčín District